Mount Lewis, a suburb of local government area City of Canterbury-Bankstown, is 18 km south-west of the Sydney central business district, in the state of New South Wales, Australia. It is a part of the South-western Sydney region.

History
Mount Lewis takes its name from the highest point in the district at Mount Lewis Reserve on Wattle Street. The origin of the name is unclear but it reflects the height which provides good views west towards the Bankstown CBD, south towards Canterbury Road and east towards the Sydney CBD skyline. Thomas Collins acquired  of land in 1834–35.

Commercial area
Mount Lewis is a mostly residential suburb with a few shops and commercial developments located on Wattle Street. Mount Lewis Bowling Club is located on Waterloo Road.

Schools
Mount Lewis has an infants school on Noble Avenue.

References

City of Canterbury-Bankstown
Suburbs of Sydney